The city of Buffalo, New York consists of five sectors of thirty-five different neighborhoods, over an area of fifty-two square miles.

Background 
The boundaries of Buffalo's neighborhoods have changed over time. The city is officially divided into five areas with each containing several neighborhoods; in total, there are 35 of them in the city. 

Some neighborhoods in Buffalo have seen increased investment since the 1990s, beginning with the Elmwood Village. The redevelopment of the Larkin Terminal Warehouse in 2002 led to the creation of the Larkin District, home to several mixed-use projects and anchored by corporate offices. Downtown Buffalo and the central business district (CBD) saw a 10.6% increase in residents from 2010–2017 as over 1,061 units of housing came online, continuing into 2020 with the redevelopment of the Seneca One Tower. Other revitalized areas include Chandler Street in the Grant-Amherst neighborhood and Hertel Avenue in Parkside.

In 2017, the Buffalo Common Council adopted its Green Code, which was the first overhaul of  the city's zoning code since 1953. Its emphasis on regulations which promote pedestrian safety and mixed usage of land earned an award at the Congress for New Urbanism conference in 2019.

Central 

The Central sector contains Downtown Buffalo as well as portions of the Outer Harbor.

East

Masten Park

Delavan Grider 
Also known as "Lamp City"

Ellicott

Fillmore-Leroy

Pratt-Willert Park

Fruit Belt (Medical Park)

Genessee-Moselle

Hamlin Park 

The Hamlin Park Historic District was listed on the National Register of Historic Places in 2013.

Kenfield

Kensington-Bailey

Lovejoy

MLK Park

Broadway-Fillmore

Schiller Park

North

Black Rock

Central Park

Grant-Amherst

North Park

Parkside 
See Parkside East Historic District and Parkside West Historic District.

Riverside

University Heights

West Hertel

South 

South Buffalo, which was split by the construction of Interstate 190 during the 1950s, is troubled by the presence of a concrete crushing facility which is grandfathered in as a pre-existing use, while dust and truck traffic from the facility strongly affect residences in the neighborhood.

First Ward

Hopkins-Tifft

Kaisertown

Seneca Babcock

Seneca-Cazenovia

South Park

West

Allentown

Elmwood-Bidwell

Elmwood-Bryant 

The American Planning Association named the Elmwood Village neighborhood in Buffalo one of ten Great Neighborhoods in 2007. Elmwood Village is a pedestrian-oriented, mixed use neighborhood with hundreds of small, locally owned boutiques, shops, restaurants, and cafes. The neighborhood is located to the south of Buffalo State College.

Linwood Historic District
Runs along the entirety of Linwood Avenue from North Street in the south to West Delavan Avenue in the north.

Lower West Side 
See West Village Historic District and Fargo Estate Historic District.

Upper West Side

West Side

References 

Neighborhoods in Buffalo, New York
Buffalo, New York-related lists